Bozo or bozo may refer to:

People
Bozo people, a fishing people of the central Niger delta in Mali
Bozo language, languages of the Bozo people
Frédéric Bozo, history Professor at the University of Paris III: Sorbonne Nouvelle
Bozo Miller (1918–2008), American restaurant owner, Gastronomical Champion of competitive eating, and Guinness World Record holder

Art, entertainment, and media

Fictional characters and mascots
Bozo (comic strip), a pantomime comic strip by Foxo Reardon
Bozo (mascot), a former wildcat kept as a live mascot for the University of New Hampshire
Bozo the Clown, a clown character in the United States
Bozo the Iron Man, a 1930s/40s era comic book superhero

Film and television
Bozo (film), a 2013 Japanese drama film
The Bozo Show, locally produced children's television program on WGN-TV in Chicago and on WGN America

Music
Bozo (album), the debut album of the singer/songwriter Lida Husik
 "Bozo", a 1951 song by Félix Leclerc from his debut album, Chante ses derniers succès sur disques
"Bozos", a single by the UK band The Levellers
Bozo Ratliff, rockabilly singer from 1950s
Bozo, an album by American rapper Saint Dog

Computing
Bozo bit, a copy protection system in 1980s Apple Macintosh operating system
Bozo filter or email filtering, the processing of email to organize it according to specified criteria
Bozo sort, a particularly ineffective sorting algorithm based on the generate and test paradigm

Slang
Bozo, a colloquial vulgarism for a prostitute in the Georgian language
Bozo, a slang phrase for an idiot

Other uses
Spee De Bozo, J. Edgar Hoover's dog
Bozo, nickname of ProRodeo Hall of Fame barrel racing horse, registered name French Flash Hawk

See also
Božo, a given name
Boso (disambiguation)

Language and nationality disambiguation pages